The Nepal T20 League (abbreviated as NepalT20) is a Nepalese men's Twenty20 cricket league which was established by the Cricket Association of Nepal in 2022. The first edition of the tournament is being held from 24 December 2022 to 11 January 2023.

History
The Cricket Association of Nepal (CAN) signed a NPR 330 million agreement with Indian sports management company Seven3Sports for a period of eight years to hold a franchise Twenty20 league tournament on 26 April 2022. On 18 May 2022, CAN announced that the first edition of the tournament would be held in 24 September to 22 October of the year.  The league was authorized by the International Cricket Council on 11 July 2022. On 19 July 2022, four franchises, Lumbini All Stars, Kantipur Capital, Biratnagar Super Kings and Janakpur Royals, and their owners were announced. Two more franchises, Pokhara Avengers and Far West United were announced on 8 September 2022 along with their owners. The draft for the first edition of the league was held from 10 September 2022 to 11 September 2022. On 15 September 2022, the league was postponed to December of the same year after security concerns following announcement of the 2022 Nepalese general election. The league was supposed to be held from 11 December 2022 but was postponed to 23 December after Kathmandu Gurkhas (renamed from Kantipur Capital) withdrew from the tournament. The team was replaced by a new Kathmandu franchise, the Kathmandu Knights. The league was again postponed for a day and the 2022 edition officially began on 24 December 2022.

Teams

Tournament seasons and results

Prize money 
Cricket Association of Nepal (CAN) announced a total prize money of रु 10 million for the four franchises that reach the play-offs. The prize money is split as follows:
 रु 500,000 – To the loser of the Eliminator
 रु 1,000,000 – To the loser of Qualifier 2
 रु 3,000,000 – To the Runner up
 रु 5,500,000 – To the Champion

In addition to this the player of the series will receive रु 500,000, the best bowler and the best batsmen will receive रु 200,000 each, the rising player will be awarded रु 180,000 and the player of the match will receive रु 40,000.

See also 
 Everest Premier League
 Dhangadhi Premier League
 Pokhara Premier League

References

Twenty20 cricket leagues
Nepalese domestic cricket competitions
Sports leagues established in 2022
2022 establishments in Nepal
Recurring sporting events established in 2022